Hippos or Sussita (Aramaic) is an ancient city and archaeological site located on a hill 2 km east of the Sea of Galilee, attached by a topographical saddle to the western slopes of the Golan Heights.

Hippos was a Hellenistic city in the northern Jordan Valley, and a long-time member of the Decapolis, a group of ten cities more closely tied to the Greco-Roman culture than to the local Semitic-speaking population. Later, Hippos became a predominantly Christian city, which declined towards the end of the Byzantine period and throughout the Early Muslim period, and was abandoned after the 749 earthquake.

Location

Besides the fortified city itself, Hippos controlled two harbor facilities on the Sea of Galilee and a large area of the surrounding hinterland (Hippos' Territorium).

The site is located within the 1949 UN-demarcated Demilitarized Zone between Syria and Israel, per the Israel–Syria Mixed Armistice Commission.

Etymology 
Founded as a polis by the name Antioch of Hippos during the Seleucids, the city is named after the Greek language word for horse, Hippos, and a common name of Seleucid monarchs, Antiochus. In the 3rd-century Mosaic of Rehob, the site is known by its Aramaic name, Sussita, a word meaning "horse" in the feminine gender, while the Arabic name, Qal‘at al-Ḥiṣn or Qal‘at al-Ḥuṣn, has been used by the country's Arab inhabitants, meaning, "Fortress of the Horse/Stallion". Other names include the alternate spelling Hippus (accusative Hippum), a Latinized version of the Greek name. The precise reason why the city received this name is unknown.

History
There is archaeological evidence for habitation at Hippos from the Neolithic period.

Hellenistic period
The site was again inhabited in the third century BCE by the Ptolemies, though whether it was an urban settlement or a military outpost is still unknown. During this time, Coele-Syria served as the battleground between two dynasties descending from captains of Alexander the Great, the Ptolemies and the Seleucids. It is likely that Hippos, on a very defensible site along the border lines of the 3rd century BCE, was founded as a border fortress for the Ptolemies. The city of Hippos itself was established by Seleucid colonists, most likely in the middle of the second century BCE. Its full name, Antiochia Hippos, reflects a Seleucid founding.

As the Seleucids took possession of all of Coele-Syria, Hippos grew into a full-fledged polis, a city-state with control over the surrounding countryside. Antiochia Hippos was improved with all the makings of a Greek polis: a temple, a central market area, and other public structures. The availability of water limited the size of Hellenistic Hippos. The citizens relied on rain-collecting cisterns for all their water; this kept the city from supporting a very large population.

In c. 83–80 BCE, amid the breakdown of Seleucide rule, the Hasmonean ruler Alexander Jannaeus led a campaign to conquer lands east of the Jordan River, including the Golan, leading to the area being annexed by the independent kingdom for the last two decades before the Roman intervention in Syria.

Roman period
In 63 BCE the Roman general Pompey conquered Coele-Syria, including Judea, and ended Hasmonean independence. Pompey granted self-rule to roughly ten Greek cities on Coele-Syria's eastern frontier; this group, of which Hippos was one, came to be called the Decapolis and was incorporated into the Roman Provincia Syria. Under Roman rule, Hippos was granted a certain degree of autonomy. The city minted its own coins, stamped with the image of a horse in honor of the city's name.

Hippos was given to Herod the Great in 37 BCE and returned to the Province of Syria at his death in 4 BCE. According to Josephus, during this time Hippos, a pagan city, was the "sworn enemy" of the new Jewish city across the lake, Tiberias. Josephus reports that during the First Jewish–Roman War of AD 66–70, Hippos persecuted its Jewish population. Other Jews from Sussita participated in attacks on Magdala and elsewhere. Hippos region fell under attack by rebels at least once.

After the Romans put down the next Jewish revolt, they created the province of Syria Palaestina in 135, of which Hippos was a part. This was the beginning of Hippos' greatest period of prosperity and growth. It was rebuilt along a grid pattern, centered around a long decumanus maximus running east–west through the city. The great expense required to haul these columns to Palestine and up the hill is proof of the city's wealth. Other improvements included a Kalybe (a shrine to the Emperor), a theatre, an odeon, a basilica, and new city walls. The most important improvement, however, was the aqueduct, which led water into Hippos from springs in the Golan Heights, 24 km long each aqueduct. The water, collected in a large, vaulted cistern, allowed a large population to live in the city.

During the Late Roman period, the imperial restructuring under Diocletian placed Hippos in the province of Palaestina Secunda, encompassing Galilee and the Golan.

Byzantine period
When Christianity became officially tolerated in the Roman Empire, giving rise to what is called by historians the Byzantine period, Palestine became the target of imperial subsidies for churches and monasteries, and Christian pilgrims brought additional revenue.

Christianity came slowly to Hippos. There is no evidence of any Christian presence before the 4th century. Gradually, the city was Christianized, becoming the seat of a bishop by at least 359. One Bishop Peter of Hippos is listed in surviving records of church councils in 359 and 362.

Rashidun and Umayyad periods 
The Muslim armies of the Rashidun period invaded Palestine in the 7th century, completing their conquest by 641. Hippos' new Arab rulers allowed the citizens to continue practicing Christianity, a policy then continued by the Umayyad Caliphate. According to archaeologists, the Islamic regime did not pull down the churches but Christian imagery engraved on Byzantine brass bread stamps and chancel screens was covered over with a paste of tin and lead.

However, the population and economy continued to decline. The earthquake of 749 destroyed Hippos and it was abandoned permanently.

History of archaeological research

1880s surveys

G. Schumacher visited the ruin in 1883–1885, giving a protracted account of Hippos (Kŭlat el Husn) in his work, The Jaulân, although he had incorrectly surmised that the site may have been the ancient Gamala described by Josephus.

1950s excavations and aftermath
The first excavations were carried out by Israeli archaeologists Emmanuel Anati, Claire Epstein, Michael Avi-Yona and others from 1951 to 1955. They unearthed some domestic buildings, the main city gate at the east and a large Byzantine church that had probably been the seat of Hippos' bishop. After the excavations, the Israel Defense Forces used Mount Sussita for the same purpose as the ancient Greeks—as a fortress. It was used as a border defense against Syria until much of the Golan Heights were captured by Israel in the 1967 Six-Day War.

In 1964 Mt. Sussita was declared a national park and in 2004 the area around it, including the site itself, were declared a national reserve.

Survey and excavation since 1999
Following an archaeological survey conducted in 1999, it was decided to embark on a large-scale scientific project of excavations. The site has been excavated annually since, with the 14th season of excavations slated to take place in the summer of 2013.

The research undertaken at Hippos-Sussita is an international project. The first eleven seasons (2000–2010) were an Israeli–Polish–American collaboration, co-directed by Professor Arthur Segal and Dr. Michael Eisenberg from the Zinman Institute of Archaeology, University of Haifa; Professor Jolanta Młynarczyk from the Research Centre for Mediterranean Archaeology, Polish Academy of Sciences; Dr. Mariusz Burdajewicz of the National Museum, Warsaw; and Dr. Mark Schuler from Concordia University, St. Paul, Minnesota, USA. The main areas of excavation were the odeion, the Roman basilica, the North-West Church, the North-East Church and its surrounding insulae, domestic quarters, the southern bathhouse, the eastern defensive ditch and fortifications next to it and the necropoleis (burial grounds). From 2012 on the excavations are directed by Dr. Michael Eisenberg, focusing on the Roman basilica, the Roman-Byzantine southern bathhouse, the north-east insula, the living quarters and the Roman bastion. From 2016 on Dr. Arleta Kowalewska joined the directorship and the team focuses on the street network, saddle compound and saddle necropolis.

Objective
The objective of the expedition is to uncover the entire ancient city, the street network, the main secular and religious public buildings, as well as the domestic quarters. It also hopes to survey and excavate the two necropoleis located to the south and the south-east of the city. The relationship between the city and the surrounding countryside will also be examined in future seasons, especially the area stretching between the city and the lake. Furthermore, it plans to conduct a detailed survey of the lake's shore to establish the exact location of Hippos' port.

Findings

In 2015 a large bronze mask, almost without equal for its dimensions and dated between the 1st century BCE and the 2nd century CE, depicting the Greek god Pan was retrieved by archaeologists from the site.

Christian tradition
In the New Testament, when Jesus mentions a "city set upon a hill" that "cannot be hidden" (one of the metaphors of Salt and Light in the Sermon on the Mount), he may have been referring to Hippos, although there have been speculations that he referred to Safed. In addition, a miracle of Jesus recounted in Mark 5 and Luke 8 may also be related to Hippos. See Gergesa for a discussion of the location of this miracle.

Catholic mystic Maria Valtorta in her vision-based work "Poem of the Man God" asserted that Jesus Christ visited and preached in Hippos.

References

External links
 Full list of Hippos related publications and links
 Hippos (Sussita) – Excavation Project.
 Pan at Hippos, BAR, November–December 2015.
 "Antiochia Hippos: Revealing a lost city of the Roman Decapolis", Current World Archaeology 69, 2015. 
 "The Spade Hits Sussita", Forty Groundbreaking Articles from Forty Years of Biblical Archaeology Review, November 2015. 
 Explanatory signs in English and in Hebrew set at Hippos by the expedition (2014).
 Pictures of Hippos

Further reading
Bagatti, Bellarmino. "Hippos-Susita, an Ancient Episcopal See." Ancient Christian Villages of Galilee. Jerusalem: Franciscan Printing Press, 2001. pp. 59–66.
Burdajewicz, J. Wall Painting Decoration from the North-West Church in Hippos-Sussita of the Decapolis, Études et Travaux  XXX (2017), 161–180.
Burdajewicz, M. Glass Finds in Archaeological Context. A Case Study of Hippos (Sussita), Études et Travaux  XXIV (2011), 22–40.
Burdajewicz, M. From Pagan Temple to Church in Late Antiquity Palestine A View from Hippos-Sussita", Études et Travaux XXX (2017), 29–71.
Burdajewicz, M. The Glass Vessels of the Roman, Byzantine and Early Islamic Periods at Hippos: An Overview of the Main Types. In: M. Eisenberg, Hippos - Sussita of the Decapolis: The First Twelve Seasons of Excavations 2000-2011, Volume II, The Zinman Institute of Archaeology, 2018, 276–319.
Burdajewicz, M. and Młynarczyk, J. Elements of the Liturgical Furniture in an 8th-century Church (NWC) in Hippos (Susita), Israel” Series Byzantina IV, Warszawa 2006, 9-37.
Burdajewicz, M. and Młynarczyk, J. Reading the record of the last Christians of Susita (Hippos). In: P. Ballet, S. Lemaître, I. Bertrand (eds), De la Gaule à l’ Orient méditerranéen. Fonctions et status des mobiliers archéologiques dans leur contexte, Presses Universitaires de Rennes, Institut Français d'archéologie orientale, 2018, 139–144.
Chancey, Mark A. and Adam Porter. "The Archaeology of Roman Palestine." Near Eastern Archaeology, Vol. 64, No. 4. December 2001. pp. 164–198.
 Eisenberg, Michael. http://hippos.haifa.ac.il/images/Publications/BAR_ND15_Eisenberg_2S.pdf “Pan at Hippos”, Biblical Archaeology Review, Vol. 41/6, November/December 2015, p. 40–45, 72.
 Eisenberg, Michael. http://popular-archaeology.com/issue/summer-2015/article/new-discoveries-at-hippos “New Discoveries at Hippos”], Popular Archaeology, 2015.
 Eisenberg, Michael. http://hippos.haifa.ac.il/images/Publications/Eisenberg_Mivzarim.pdf “The Military Architecture of Antiochia Hippos (Sussita) during the Roman Period”] in: Aviam, M. (ed.), "From Watch Tower to Fortified city": Forts and Fortresses in Northern Israel from the Canaanites to the IDF, p. 113–129 (Hebrew), 2015.
 Eisenberg, Michael. “Hippos-Sussita: From a Polis in the Decapolis to a Declining Town”, Qadmoniot 151, Jerusalem 2016, p. 2-17 (Hebrew).
 Eisenberg, Michael (editor). Hippos of the Decapolis and its Region - 18 Years of Research, Michmanim 27, Haifa, December 2017.
 Eisenberg, Michael. "Antiochia Hippos: Revealing a lost city of the Roman Decapolis" Popular Archaeology, March 2012.
Eisenberg, M. Hippos (Sussita) of the Decapolis: The First Twelve Seasons of Excavations (2000–2011), Volume II, The Zinman Institute of Archaeology, University of Haifa, Haifa 2018.
Eisenberg, M. A VISITOR'S GUIDE TO ANCIENT HIPPOS Above the Sea of Galilee, Israel 2021.
Epstein, Claire. "Hippos (Sussita)." The New Encyclopedia of Archaeological Excavations in the Holy Land. Vol. 2. Ed. Ephraim Stern. Jerusalem: Israel Exploration Society & Carta, 1993.
Łajtar, A. Greek Inscriptions. In: Hippos - Sussita of the Decapolis: The First Twelve Seasons of Excavations 2000-2011, Volume I, A. Segal, M. Eisenberg, J. Młynarczyk, M. Burdajewicz, M. Schuler, The Zinman Institute of Archaeology, Haifa 2013, 250–277.
Łajtar, A. and Młynarczyk, J. A Faction Acclamation Incised on a Pithos Found Near the North-West Church at Hippos (Sussita), Études et Travaux  XXX(2017), 289–302.
Młynarczyk, J. Hippos (Sussita): Exploration of the North-west Church Complex (Areas NWC and OPB) in 2002, Światowit IV (XLV), Fasc. A, 2003, 73–78.
Młynarczyk, J. and Burdajewicz, M. North-West Church in Hippos (Sussita), Israel: Five Years of Archaeological Research (2000-2004), Eastern Christian Art 2 (2005), 39–58.
Młynarczyk, J. Blessed Wine: a Newly Discovered Winery at the North-West Church in Hippos – Susita (Israel), Przez granice czasu. Księga Pamiątkowa Jerzego Gąssowskiego, Pultusk 2008, 386–395.
Młynarczyk, J. Architectural and Functional/Liturgical Development of the North-West Church in Hippos (Sussita), Etudes et Travaux XXII (2008), 147–170.
Młynarczyk, J. The fading lights of a church. In: D. Frangié et Jean-François Salles éds., Lampes antiques du Bilad es Sham, Paris 2011, 183–195.
Młynarczyk, J. Umayyad-period Terracotta Lamps from Hippos (Susita),  Jund al Urdunn. In: D. Frangié et Jean-François Salles éds., Lampes antiques du Bilad es Sham, Paris 2011, 197-210
Młynarczyk, J. Hellenistic Pottery Deposits at Hippos of the Decapolis, Proceedings of the 7 Epistemonike Synantese gia ten Ellenistike Keramike, Aigio 4-8. 04. 2005, Athena 2011.
Młynarczyk, J. Churches and the Society in Byzantine-period Hippos, Proceedings of the conference   Decapolis, ARAM Society, Oxford, 7–10 July 2008, 253–284. 
Młynarczyk, J. Wine for the Christians in Early Islamic Susita (Hippos of the Decapolis), Etudes et Travauv XXVI (2013), 473-485
Młynarczyk, J. and Burdajewicz, M. The Northwest Church Complex.  In: Hippos - Sussita of the Decapolis: The First Twelve Seasons of Excavations 2000-2011, Volume I, A. Segal, M. Eisenberg, J. Mlynarczyk, M. Burdajewicz, M. Schuler, The Zinman Institute of Archaeology, Haifa 2013, 194–217.
Parker, S. Thomas. "The Byzantine Period: An Empire’s New Holy Land." Near Eastern Archaeology, Vol. 62, No. 3. September 1999. pp. 134–171.
Radziejowska, E. and Burdajewicz, J. Conservation. In: Hippos - Sussita of the Decapolis: The First Twelve Seasons of Excavations 2000-2011, Volume I, A. Segal, M. Eisenberg, J. Młynarczyk, M. Burdajewicz, M. Schuler, The Zinman Institute of Archaeology, Haifa 2013, 302–311.
Russell, Kenneth W. "The Earthquake Chronology of Palestine and Northwest Arabia from the 2nd through the Mid-8th Century A.D." Bulletin of the American Schools of Oriental Research, No. 260. 1982. pp. 37–53.
A. Segal, M. Eisenberg, J. Młynarczyk, M. Burdajewicz, M. Schuler, Hippos (Sussita) of the Decapolis: The First Twelve Seasons of Excavations (2000–2011), Volume I, The Zinman Institute of Archaeology, University of Haifa, Haifa 2014.
 Segal, Arthur and Eisenberg, Michael. "Unearthing Sussita"Popular Archaeology, March 2012.

Decapolis
Ancient Greek archaeological sites in Western Asia
Hellenistic sites
Historic sites in Israel
National parks of Israel
Roman towns and cities in Israel
Classical sites on the Golan Heights
Former populated places on the Golan Heights
Archaeological sites in Israel
2nd-century BC establishments in the Seleucid Empire
749 disestablishments
Buildings and structures in Northern District (Israel)
Establishments in the Ptolemaic Kingdom
Seleucid colonies
Roman Syria
Herodian kingdom
8th-century disestablishments in the Umayyad Caliphate
Populated places disestablished in the 8th century
Sea of Galilee